The HCE was a British four wheeled cyclecar made in 1912 and 1913 originally by H.C.E. Cars of London SW and later by the Easycar Company at a  site with test track in Harold Wood, then in Essex.

The car used a single cylinder Buckingham engine with a tax rating of 6/8 HP driving by chain to a two speed gearbox and then by belt to the rear wheels.

A range of body styles were advertised including four seaters. In 1913, and very unusual for the time, four wheel brakes were fitted.

See also
 List of car manufacturers of the United Kingdom

References 

Vehicles introduced in 1912
Cyclecars
Defunct motor vehicle manufacturers of England
Motor vehicle manufacturers based in London